The Angel's chameleon (Furcifer angeli), initially described as Chamaeleo angeli, is a species of chameleon, a lizard in the family Chamaeleonidae. The species is endemic to Madagascar, and was originally described by Édouard-Raoul Brygoo and Charles Antoine Domergue in 1968.

Etymology
The specific name, angeli, is in honour of French herpetologist Fernand Angel.

Distribution and habitat
Furcifer angeli is endemic to Madagascar, and can be found in dry forest at the northwest of the country. It has been found in Bongolava, and between Anjiamangirana I and Namoroka National Park.
It has also been reported to occur at Ambohibola and on the coast near Antsanitia in Mahajanga province. It lives in trees in dry forests and is diurnal.

Conservation status
F. angeli is listed as being of Least Concern by the International Union for Conservation of Nature (IUCN). Although the natural habitat of this species is virgin forest, it also occurs close to roads and human habitations. The population size is unknown but is believed to be stable. The main threat to this chameleon is the destruction of forest, including illegal logging, slash-and-burn, but also wildfires.

Description
F. angeli looks like a "drably coloured" version of Furcifer pardalis (the panther chameleon). It often has a white stripe down each side and can be distinguished from the otherwise similar Furcifer lateralis by the presence of a spike at the front of its head.

Taxonomy
F. angeli was initially described by Brygoo and Domergue in 1968 as Chamaeleo angeli, but was later transferred to the genus Furcifer. Furcifer angeli is also known as "Angel's chameleon" after the French herpetologist Fernand Angel.

References

Further reading
Brygoo É-R, Domergue CA (1968). "Les Caméléons à rostre impair et rigide de l'Ouest de Madagascar. Validité des espèces Chamaeleo labordi Grandidier, 1872, et C. antimena Grandidier, 1872. Description d'un espèce nouvelle C. angeli n. sp. et de la femelle de C. rhinoceratus Gray, 1845 ". Mémoires du Muséum national d'Histoire naturelle: Zoologie, Series A 52 (2): 71-110. (Chamaeleo angeli, new species, p. 104). (in French).

Furcifer
chameleon
chameleon
Reptiles described in 1968
Taxa named by Édouard-Raoul Brygoo
Taxa named by Charles Domergue
Madagascar dry deciduous forests